Uptown–Parker–Gray Historic District is a national historic district located at Alexandria, Virginia.  The district encompasses 984 contributing buildings in the northwestern quadrant of the Old Town Alexandria street grid as it was laid out in 1797.  It mostly consists of small row houses and town houses, but there are also many commercial buildings. The buildings are representative of a number of popular 19th-century architectural styles including Greek Revival and Queen Anne.  Also included are more than 200 units of public housing, built between the early 1940s and 1959 as Colonial Revival-style row houses.

It was added to the National Register of Historic Places in 2010.

References

Greek Revival architecture in Virginia
Queen Anne architecture in Virginia
Colonial Revival architecture in Virginia
National Register of Historic Places in Alexandria, Virginia
Historic districts on the National Register of Historic Places in Virginia